Stenka Razin, a Cossack leader
 Stenka Razin (film), the first finished Russian narrative film
 Stenka Razin (Glazunov), a symphonic poem composed by Alexander Glazunov
 The Execution of Stepan Razin, a cantata composed by Dimitri Shostakovich